The United Arab States (UAS) was a short-lived confederation of the United Arab Republic (Egypt and Syria) and the Mutawakkilite Kingdom of Yemen (North Yemen) from 1958 to 1961.

The United Arab Republic was a sovereign state formed by the union of Egypt and Syria in 1958. The same year, the Kingdom of Yemen (North Yemen), which had already signed a defense pact with Egypt, joined with the new state in 1958 in a loose confederation called the United Arab States. One reason for this decision was the fact that, for a long time, Yemen had felt threatened by its considerably larger and more powerful northern neighbour, Saudi Arabia (the two had fought a war in 1934, and still shared a partially undemarcated border), and thus saw the confederation as a source of security. However, unlike the member countries of the United Arab Republic, North Yemen remained an independent sovereign state. It maintained its UN membership and separate embassies throughout the whole period of confederation.

Neither the union nor the confederation fulfilled their role as vehicles of pan-Arabism or Arab nationalism, as they were dissolved in 1961.

See also
 United Arab Republic, a union of Egypt and Syria (1958–1961).
 Arab Federation, a confederation between Iraq and Jordan (1958).
 Federation of Arab Republics (1972–1977).
 Arab Islamic Republic (1974).

References

External links
The Charter of the United Arab States. in Basic Documents of the Arab Unifications. p. 21.

Arab nationalism in Egypt
Arab nationalism in Syria
Arab nationalism in Yemen
Former Arab states
Pan-Arabism
States and territories established in 1958
States and territories disestablished in 1961
United Arab Republic